Darrell Hay (born April 2, 1980) is a Canadian former professional ice hockey defenceman. He was selected by the Vancouver Canucks in the ninth round (271st overall) of the 1999 NHL Entry Draft. Darrell is the son of Don Hay, who is the former coach of the Vancouver Giants and current Kamloops Blazers Head Coach of the WHL.

Hay played with BK Mladá Boleslav in the Czech Extraliga during the 2010–11 Czech Extraliga season.

Career statistics

References

External links

1980 births
Living people
HC Bílí Tygři Liberec players
Canadian ice hockey defencemen
Columbia Inferno players
SG Cortina players
Florida Everblades players
Grand Rapids Griffins players
Kansas City Blades players
Ice hockey people from British Columbia
Idaho Steelheads (ECHL) players
Lillehammer IK players
Manitoba Moose players
BK Mladá Boleslav players
People from Kamloops
Schwenninger Wild Wings players
Sheffield Steelers players
Sportspeople from Kamloops
Tohoku Free Blades players
Tri-City Americans players
Utah Grizzlies (AHL) players
Vancouver Canucks draft picks
Canadian expatriate ice hockey players in England
Canadian expatriate ice hockey players in the Czech Republic
Canadian expatriate ice hockey players in the United States
Canadian expatriate ice hockey players in Germany
Canadian expatriate ice hockey players in Italy
Canadian expatriate ice hockey players in Norway
Canadian expatriate ice hockey players in Japan